George Thomas Davis (January 12, 1810 – June 17, 1877) was a U.S. Representative from Massachusetts.

Early life and education
George Davis was born in Sandwich, Massachusetts. He attended Harvard University and graduated in 1829. His classmates included William Henry Channing, James Freeman Clarke, Benjamin Robbins Curtis, Oliver Wendell Holmes Sr., Benjamin Peirce, and Samuel Francis Smith. He later studied law at Cambridge and Greenfield, Massachusetts.

Career
Davis was admitted to the bar in 1832 and commenced practice in Greenfield, Franklin County. He  established the Franklin Mercury in 1833.

He entered into politics served as member of the State Senate in 1839 and 1840.

He was elected as a Whig to the 32nd Congress (March 4, 1851 – March 3, 1853). He was not a candidate for renomination in 1852 and instead resumed the practice of law in Taunton and Greenfield, Massachusetts.

He did not give up on politics however and served as member of the State House of Representatives in 1861.

Later life and death
Davis moved to Portland, Maine, where he died June 17, 1877. He was interred in Green River Cemetery, Greenfield, Massachusetts.

References

1810 births
1877 deaths
Harvard University alumni
Massachusetts lawyers
Massachusetts state senators
Members of the Massachusetts House of Representatives
People from Sandwich, Massachusetts
Politicians from Portland, Maine
People from Greenfield, Massachusetts
Whig Party members of the United States House of Representatives from Massachusetts
19th-century American politicians
19th-century American lawyers